Hulton may refer to:

People with the surname
 Edward Hulton (1838–1904), British newspaper proprietor and father of Sir Edward Hulton, 1st Baronet
 Sir Edward Hulton, 1st Baronet (1869-1925), British newspaper proprietor and father of Edward George Warris Hulton
 Edward George Warris Hulton (1906–1988), British magazine publisher
 Jim Hulton (born 1969), Canadian ice hockey coach
 William Hulton (1787–1864), English landowner of Hulton Park, Over Hulton, Lancashire
 Hulton Baronets

Places
 Abbey Hulton, a town in Staffordshire, England, historically known as Hulton
 Little Hulton, in Salford, Greater Manchester, England